Penelope Pitstop is a fictional character who appeared in the 1968 Hanna-Barbera animated series Wacky Races and the spin-off The Perils of Penelope Pitstop, and was voiced by Janet Waldo. She also appeared in the 2017 reboot of Wacky Races.

Background
Penelope "Penny" Pitstop is an attractive southern belle, and the only female racer in the original Wacky Races lineup, driving a pink feminine car known as The Compact Pussycat which has personal grooming facilities that would sometimes backfire on other racers, such as shampoo foam hitting their faces. She always has time to relax and worry about her looks, because her car is like a beauty parlor. Penelope Pitstop also has a habit of holding her arm out in the breeze to dry newly applied nail polish, which the others mistake for a turn signal (this habit once sent the Roaring Plenty into a cactus).

Peter Perfect had a crush on her, a feeling that was returned, and always tried to help her; in "Dash to Delaware", they almost end up married. In the 2007 TV short Wacky Races Forever it is revealed that she had two children with Peter Perfect.

Unlike other drivers, Penelope rarely was targeted by the other racers (except Dick Dastardly of course), as it seems they also liked and tried to help her as Peter did. Penny was always thankful for their assistance and was perhaps the most peaceful racer on the track, though she twice gave the Creepy Coupe's dragon and serpent a good bashing with her umbrella. In the 2017 version, she eventually shows martial arts skills.

Penelope also had her own cartoon series, The Perils of Penelope Pitstop, which also featured her rescuers the Ant Hill Mob. Her sworn enemy is the Hooded Claw (who is the secret identity of her own guardian, Sylvester Sneekly). Although she is blind to the fact her guardian is her nemesis in disguise, she is very smart and often manages to get herself out of trouble before her true guardians the Ant Hill Mob can get to her in time.

In Wacky Races, Penelope has long blond hair in a full fringe. She wears a purple racer helmet with goggles. She also wears a dark pink rider jacket with a purple turtleneck and purple job gloves, pink skirt with red pants underneath and white boots.

In The Perils of Penelope Pitstop, Penelope's eyes resemble those of Daphne Blake, and despite having white sclerae, she wears red lipstick. She wears a slight alteration to her Wacky Races wardrobe.  Her helmet is replaced by a magenta pilot helmet with matching white goggles. She wears a hot pink long-sleeved jacket with a matching belt and long magenta scarf, which is hanging loose on the right side. Even though she still wears her red pants and white boots from Wacky Races, her job gloves are now white.

In the 2017 reboot of Wacky Races she also has a sister, Pandora Pitstop.

Relatives

 Peter Perfect: Penelope's husband from the reboot. Voiced by Diedrich Bader.
 Pandora and Petunia Pitstop: Penelope's twin sister and mother, respectively, from the reboot. Voiced by Nicole Parker.
 Parker and Piper Perfect: Peter and Penelope's children from Wacky Races Forever.
 Johnny Pitstop: Penelope's younger brother from the reboot.

Penelope Pitstop in popular culture

 The character is mentioned in the Type O Negative song "How Could She?".
 The character is mentioned in the Jurassic 5 song "The Influence".
 A range of Penelope Pitstop graphic shirts have been released in Singapore under Zara Kids.
 Big Daddy Kane mentions her name in his 1993 song "Niggaz Never Learn".
 "Penelope Pitstop" is the name of a Breakbot song.
 Crash Bandicoot character Pasadena O'Possum is based on Penelope.
 Penelope Pitstop is parodied in the South Park episode "Handicar" as part of its Wacky Races parody.
 A Penelope Pitstop doll is the User in a racing game in the episode "Firewall", in the CGI cartoon ReBoot. 
 In Scooby-Doo! Mask of the Blue Falcon, two girls cosplay as Penelope Pitstop at a Hanna-Barbera convention.
 Akira the Don mentions her by name in his 2005 single "Clones".
 The name “Penelope Pitstop” is regularly referenced by Jim Cornette on his podcast. It is specifically used by Cornette as a derogatory nickname for pro-wrestler Penelope Ford. 
 The character is frequently mentioned by Tim Key, Alex Horne and Mark Watson in their YouTube series No More Jockeys. Key in particular has lost several matches as a result of unsuccessfully playing Penelope Pitstop as his nomination.
 Penelope Pitstop is one of the drivers that appear in final standings of the races in the 80's racing game Pitstop II.
 In the Loud House episode "Driving Miss Hazy", Leni's driving outfit resembles Penelope's, only teal.
 Penelope was among the WB characters to appear in Space Jam: A New Legacy watching the basketball game. She watches while sitting in her Compact Pussycat.
 Penelope will appear in Jellystone!

See also
 List of Hanna-Barbera characters
 List of works produced by Hanna-Barbera Productions
 Roger Ramjet
 Tom Slick

References

External links
 
 

Television characters introduced in 1968
Hanna-Barbera characters
Fictional racing drivers
Fictional American people
Female characters in animated series
Female characters in film
Wacky Races characters